Volpini may refer to:

 Arzani-Volpini, also known as Scuderia Volpini, Italian Formula One constructor
 Augusto Volpini (1832–1911), Italian painter
 Braian Volpini (born 1998), Argentinian footballer
 The Volpini Exhibition, 1889
 Xavier Tondo Volpini (1978-2011), Spanish cyclist

See also
 Volpino
 Vulpini